The Primetime Emmy Award for Outstanding Individual Achievement in Animation is an annual award given to recognize the best animators of the year. There are no nominees for this category, only winners chosen by a jury.

Winners and nominations

1990s

2000s

2010s

2020s

Programs with multiple awards

9 awards
 Love, Death & Robots (Netflix)

7 awards
 Samurai Jack (Cartoon Network/Adult Swim)

6 awards
 Adventure Time (Cartoon Network)
 The Simpsons (Fox)

5 awards
 Foster's Home for Imaginary Friends (Cartoon Network)
 Robot Chicken (Adult Swim)
 Mickey Mouse (Disney Channel)

4 awards
 Genndy Tartakovsky's Primal (Adult Swim)
 Prep & Landing (ABC)

3 awards
 Shakespeare: The Animated Tales (HBO)
 Animated Epics: The Canterbury Tales – Leaving London (HBO)
 Phineas and Ferb (Disney Channel)
 Age of Sail (YouTube)
 Arcane (Netflix)

2 awards
 Tome of the Unknown (CartoonNetwork.com)
 Gravity Falls (Disney XD)
 Futurama (Fox)
 The Powerpuff Girls (Cartoon Network)
 Gary & Mike (UPN)
 Classical Baby (HBO)
 Generator Rex (Cartoon Network)
 Firebreather (Cartoon Network)
 Secret Mountain Fort Awesome (Cartoon Network)
 Long Live the Royals (Cartoon Network)

See also
 List of animation awards
 Academy Award for Best Animated Short Film

References

Primetime Emmy Awards
American animation awards